Witter Springs (formerly Witter's Springs, Witter Medical Springs, and Witter) is a set of springs that was turned into a resort in the 1870s in Lake County, California.

Location

It is on the west side of Bachelor Valley in the Scotts Creek watershed.

History

The Witter Springs resort opened soon after the springs were discovered in 1870.
The Witter's Springs post office operated from 1873 to 1880. 
The Witter post office opened in 1901, moved and changed its name to Witter Springs in 1913. 
The ZIP code for Witter Springs is 95493.

References

Reference bibliography 

Springs of Lake County, California
Resorts in Lake County, California